Cernești is a commune in Maramureș County, Transylvania, Romania: It is composed of seven villages: Brebeni (Brébfalva), Cernești, Ciocotiș (Csókás), Fânațe (Kővárfonác), Izvoarele (Balázsszeg), Măgureni (Nagyhegy) and Trestia (Kötelesmező).

References

Communes in Maramureș County
Localities in Transylvania